Sir Peter Lauderdale Daubeny,  (16 April 1921, Wiesbaden, Germany – 6 August 1975, London) was a British theatre impresario.

Daubeny trained with Michel Saint-Denis and began his career under the director William Armstrong at the Liverpool Playhouse. Losing his left-arm at Salerno in 1943 led to him abandoning an acting career and staging his own productions including Franz Werfel's Jacobowsky and the Colonel in 1945. The London visits of the Berliner Ensemble in 1956 and the Moscow Art Theatre were organised by Daubeny.

Henry Kendall (actor), in Chapter 23 of his autobiography, 'I Remember Romano's', 'An Alligator and Mr. Chaplin', (Macdonald, London, 1960), wrote that Daubney asked him in 1955 to " ...keep an eye on his (Daubney's) revival at the Palace", (Palace Theatre, London), of The Merry Widow, starring Jan Kiepura and Marta Eggerth, while he was on business in Paris.

He is best remembered for his organisation of the World Theatre Season, which brought foreign theatre companies to London between 1964 and 1975. Amongst other honours, including an OBE in the 1961 Birthday Honours and a CBE in the 1967 New Year Honours, he was knighted in the 1973 Birthday Honours.

References

Michael Denison, ‘Daubeny, Sir Peter Lauderdale (1921–1975)’, rev. Oxford Dictionary of National Biography, Oxford University Press, 2004

1921 births
1975 deaths
German emigrants to the United Kingdom
British theatre managers and producers
Officers of the Order of the British Empire
Commanders of the Order of the British Empire
Knights Bachelor
Chevaliers of the Légion d'honneur
Gold crosses of the Order of George I
Knights of the Order of Merit of the Italian Republic
Recipients of the Order of Merit of the Federal Republic of Germany
Recipients of the Order of Polonia Restituta
Commanders of the Order of Vasa
Recipients of the Ordre des Arts et des Lettres